Boubou can refer to:

Boubou (clothing), a type of clothing worn in West Africa
Boubou, Burkina Faso, a town
Boubou Macoutes, from "Boubou", the nickname of Premier Robert Bourassa
Laniarius (boubous or gonoleks), a genus of passerine birds